Daryl Gralka Lerner (born May 4, 1954) is an American former professional tennis player.

A native of Houston, Gralka was active on the professional tour in the 1970s. She featured as a lucky loser in the singles main draw of the 1974 French Open and won her first round match over Antonella Rosa.

From 1979 to 1984 she served as the women's head coach at the University of Houston.

References

External links
 

1954 births
Living people
American female tennis players
Houston Cougars coaches
Tennis players from Houston
College tennis coaches in the United States
American tennis coaches